The white-throated mountaingem or white-throated mountain-gem (Lampornis castaneoventris) is a species of hummingbird in tribe Lampornithini of subfamily Trochilinae. It is endemic to Panama.

Taxonomy and systematics

The white-throated mountaingem is treated as a species by the International Ornithological Committee (IOC) and BirdLife International's Handbook of the Birds of the World (HBW). However, the North American Classification Committee of the American Ornithological Society and the Clements taxonomy treat it and the grey-tailed mountaingem (Lampornis cinereicauda) as subspecies of what they call the white-throated mountain-gem.

Description

It has a medium-length straight black bill, dark cheeks, and a white stripe behind the eye. Males have mostly dark bronzy green upperparts with an emerald green crown and a black to bluish black tail. Their chin and throat are white, the sides of the neck and upper breast bright green, and the lower breast and vent area dark gray. Females have entirely bright green upperparts. Their central tail feathers are dark metallic to bronze green and the outer ones paler. Their throat and belly are dark rufous and the undertail coverts are gray with white or buff edges.

Distribution and habitat

The white-throated mountaingem is found only in the mountains of western Panama's Chiriquí Province. It inhabits the interior, edges, and shrubby clearings of oak forest and also gardens in communities near the forest. In elevation it ranges from  up to timberline.

Behavior

Movement

The white-throated mountaingem is a year-round resident.

Feeding

The white-throated mountaingem feeds on nectar from a variety of flowering plants. Males typically feed at epiphytes in the forest interior while females more often feed in shrubby areas. Males are territorial, defending flower patches. They are dominant over smaller hummingbirds and subordinate to larger ones like the fiery-throated hummingbird (Panterpe insignis). The species also feeds on small arthropods gleaned from foliage.

Breeding

The white-throated mountaingem's breeding season spans from October to April. Its nest is a cup of fine fibers with moss and some lichen on the outside. The incubation length and time to fledging are not known.

Vocalization

The white-throated mountaingem makes high pitched calls described as "ziit or ziip" and also "a 'sputtery, bubbly' song".

Status

The IUCN has assessed the white-throated mountaingem as being of Least Concern, though it has a small range and its population size and trend are unknown. It is considered common. However, "this hummingbird is potentially threatened by human activities" such as deforestation for timber and agriculture.

References

Further reading
 Stiles, F. Gary & Skutch, Alexander F. (1990): A guide to the birds of Costa Rica. Cornell University Press. 

white-throated mountaingem
Birds of the Talamancan montane forests
Endemic birds of Panama
white-throated mountaingem